The 2027 ICC Cricket World Cup will be the 14th edition of the Cricket World Cup, a quadrennial One Day International (ODI) cricket tournament contested by men's national teams and organized by the International Cricket Council (ICC). It is scheduled to be hosted by South Africa, Zimbabwe and Namibia in October–November 2027. This will be the second time that South Africa and Zimbabwe will co-host the tournament after the 2003 edition while Namibia will host it for the first time. this tournament will expand to 14 teams and will have the same format that was used in 2003 edition.

Qualification
South Africa and Zimbabwe (co-hosts) and the next eight top teams in the ICC ODI rankings will qualify directly for 2027 Cricket World Cup, while the remaining 4 spots will be decided by the 2026 Cricket World Cup Qualifier. While Namibia will host the competition for the first time, they will not guaranteed a spot and will have to go through the standard qualification pathway.

Group Stage 
<onlyinclude>

Group A 

 Advance to Super Sixes

Group B 

 Advance to Super Sixes

Super Sixes 

<onlyinclude>
 Advance to Knockout Stage

Knockout Stage

Semi-finals

Final

References 

Cricket World Cup tournaments
2027 in cricket
Cricket World Cup